Mayville is a city in Traill County, North Dakota, United States. The population was 1,854 at the 2020 census. which makes Mayville the largest community in Traill County. Mayville was founded in 1881. The city's name remembers May Arnold, the first white child born in the immediate area.

Mayville is often grouped with the neighboring city of Portland. The two towns are sometimes given the name May-Port. Mayville State University is located in Mayville.

Geography
Mayville is located at  (47.499830, −97.325545).

Mayville sits in the fertile Red River Valley on the banks of the Goose River. The Valley was once a part of glacial Lake Agassiz. As the glacier receded, it left the land very flat, but also very rich. The area around Mayville is prime agricultural land.

In the summer of 2006, the community celebrated the city's 125th anniversary.

Demographics

2010 census
As of the census of 2010, there were 1,858 people, 773 households, and 384 families living in the city. The racial makeup of the city was 94.2% White, 1.8% African American, 0.6% Native American, 0.2% Asian, 0.1% Pacific Islander, 0.9% from other races, and 2.2% from two or more races. Hispanic or Latino of any race were 2.0% of the population.

There were 773 households, of which 19.3% had children under the age of 18 living with them, 41.4% were married couples living together, 6.1% had a female householder with no husband present, 2.2% had a male householder with no wife present, and 50.3% were non-families. 39.2% of all households were made up of individuals, and 17.8% had someone living alone who was 65 years of age or older. The average household size was 2.03 and the average family size was 2.74.

The median age in the city was 37.9 years. 15.3% of residents were under the age of 18; 23.2% were between the ages of 18 and 24; 17% were from 25 to 44; 22.1% were from 45 to 64; and 22.4% were 65 years of age or older. The gender makeup of the city was 48.8% male and 51.2% female.

2000 census
As of the census of 2000, there were 1,953 people, 752 households, and 417 families living in the city. The population density was 1,216.7 people per square mile (468.4/km2). There were 876 housing units at an average density of 545.7/sq mi (210.1/km2). The racial makeup of the city was 97.49% White, 0.26% African American, 1.48% Native American, 0.26% Asian, 0.05% Pacific Islander, 0.31% from other races, and 0.15% from two or more races. Hispanic or Latino of any race were 0.46% of the population.

There were 752 households, out of which 23.8% had children under the age of 18 living with them, 46.1% were married couples living together, 6.6% had a female householder with no husband present, and 44.5% were non-families. 35.0% of all households were made up of individuals, and 18.1% had someone living alone who was 65 years of age or older. The average household size was 2.16 and the average family size was 2.82.

In the city, the population was spread out, with 17.8% under the age of 18, 23.5% from 18 to 24, 18.3% from 25 to 44, 17.2% from 45 to 64, and 23.3% who were 65 years of age or older. The median age was 36 years. For every 100 females, there were 93.2 males. For every 100 females age 18 and over, there were 89.5 males.

The median income for a household in the city was $34,635, and the median income for a family was $44,931. Males had a median income of $34,107 versus $21,615 for females. The per capita income for the city was $17,079. About 6.2% of families and 13.4% of the population were below the poverty line, including 12.4% of those under age 18 and 6.2% of those age 65 or over.

Transportation

Airport
The Mayville Municipal Airport is a city-owned, public-use airport located one nautical mile (2 km) south of Mayville's central business district.

Education
Mayville is the home of Mayville State University.

Mayville is served by the May-Port CG Public Schools system. "May-Port CG" stands for "Mayville-Portland-Clifford-Galesburg." This system operates Peter Boe Jr. Elementary School, May-Port CG Middle School, and May-Port CG High School.

High school championships
 State Class 'B' boys basketball: 1944, 1946, 1972, 1987, 1996, 1997, 2002, 2003
 State Class 'B' girls basketball: 1975
 State Class 'B' football: 1977, 1984
 State Class 'B' volleyball: 1999, 2001, Winter 2002
 State Class 'B' baseball: 2015

Government

Recreation
Mayville offers several parks with the largest being Island Park. The MayPort Community Center opened in 2000 and offers space for hockey games and other community events. The Mayville Water Park opened in 2002 and features one of the larger water slides in the area. Mayville is also home to the 9-hole Mayville Golf Club.

Media

Print
The Traill County Tribune

Radio
Mayville radio stations:

FM radio:
 KMAV 105.5 "The Red River Valley's Sports Play-by-Play Leader" (Country, Sports), Pop)

AM radio:
 KMSR 1520 "Sports Radio 1520" (Sports)

Notable people

 Clarence Norman Brunsdale (1891–1978), U.S. Senator, 24th Governor of North Dakota
 Gulbrand Hagen (1864–1919), newspaper editor and publisher
 Ben Jacobson, men's basketball head coach at the University of Northern Iowa
 RaeAnn Kelsch, North Dakota politician
 Dean Knudson, Wisconsin politician
 Jim LeClair, football coach and player
 Lute Olson, former University of Arizona coach in College Basketball Hall of Fame

Climate
This climatic region is typified by large seasonal temperature differences, with warm to hot (and often humid) summers and cold (sometimes severely cold) winters.  According to the Köppen Climate Classification system, Mayville has a humid continental climate, abbreviated "Dfb" on climate maps.

References

External links

 Mayville-Portland official website
 Mayville State University website
 MPCG (Mayville-Portland-Clifford-Galesburg) Public Schools website
 Mayville diamond 75th jubilee (1956) from the Digital Horizons website
 A saga of two cities, 1881–1981: a history of Mayville-Portland and the area of the May-Port School District of Traill and Steele Counties, N. Dakota from the Digital Horizons website

Cities in North Dakota
Cities in Traill County, North Dakota
Populated places established in 1881
1881 establishments in Dakota Territory